Jack Gaud (1958  8 June 2000) was an Indian actor, film producer & military personnel known mostly for portrayal of negative roles in Hindi cinema. He died of a heart attack at the age of 42 in 2000. He entered cinema after leaving the Indian Navy.

Gaud did bit roles, especially as a criminal or the main villain's henchman in several Hindi films. He is remembered for his roles as Shamsher Singh in the film Karan Arjun and as Fracture Bandya in the film Vaastav. His last film appearance was One 2 Ka 4.

Personal life 
Jack Gaud was born in a Small Village, Khetri in Rajasthan in 1958. He joined Indian Navy. He always wanted to become an actor. He joined film industry in the year 1984 after he left Indian Navy.

Filmography

Later life 
After a successful career in film industry, Jack Gaud died of a heart attack aged just 42 on 8 June 2000 at his home in Mumbai. He was succeeded by his wife and his two sons one of whom, Amit Jack Gaud is also an actor.

References

2000 deaths
1958 births
Indian male film actors
Indian Navy personnel
Place of birth missing
20th-century Indian male actors
Male actors in Hindi cinema